Jean-Claude Renard (22 April 1922, Toulon – 19 November 2002, Paris) was a French poet.

Life
Renard entered the world of poetry with Juan in 1945, his first book. He was on the staff of Editions du Seuil and Editions Casterman.

Awards
 1988 Grand Award for Poetry of the Académie française
 1991 Prix Goncourt for poetry

Works

English translations
 Anthology of Contemporary French Poetry Graham Dunstan Martin, editor, University of Texas Press, 1971
 Selected Poems Oasis Books, Pierre de Ronsard. Ed. and trans. Malcolm Quainton, Elizabeth Vinestock. 1978,

Poetry
 Juan, 1945
 Cantiques pour des pays perdus, 1947
 Haute-mer 1950
 La métamorphose du Monde, 1951
 Père, voici que l'homme Éditions du Seuil, 1955
 En une seule vigne: poèmes, Édition du Seuil, 1959
 Incantation des eaux Éditions du Seuil, 1962
 ''La Terre du sacre, Éditions du Seuil, 1966
 La Braise et la rivière Éditions du Seuil, 1969
 Le Dieu de nuit 1973:
 La Lumière du silence Éditions du Seuil, 1978
 12 Dits 1980:
 Les Mots magiques 1980:
 Toutes les îles sont secrètes Éditions du Seuil, 1984, 
 La Terre du sacre, suivi de "La Braise et la Rivière" 1989:
 Sous de grands vents obscurs Seuil, 1990
 Le Dieu de nuit suivi de "La Lumière du silence" 1990:
 Dix Runes d'été 1994:
 Qui ou quoi? 1998:
 Ce puits que rien n'épuise Seuil, 1993
 Métamorphose du monde 2000:
 Le temps de la transmutation 2001:

Essays
 Notes sur la poésie Éditions du Seuil, 1970
 Notes sur la foi 1973:
 Le Lieu du voyageur : notes sur le mystère 1980:
 Une autre parole Éditions du Seuil, 1981, 
 «L’Expérience intérieure» de Georges Bataille ou la Négation du mystère, Éditions du Seuil, 1987
 Quand le poème devient prière 1987:
 Autres notes sur la poésie, la foi et la science Éditions du Seuil, 1995,

External links
"Un poète contemporain du Mystère : Jean-Claude Renard", Fabula, Pauline Bernon

1922 births
2002 deaths
Prix Goncourt de la Poésie winners
Prix Sainte-Beuve winners
Writers from Toulon
French male poets
20th-century French poets
20th-century French essayists
20th-century French male writers
French male non-fiction writers
Prix Guillaume Apollinaire winners